"Here Comes the Thunder" is a song co-written and recorded by Canadian country artist Tim Hicks. He wrote the track with Todd Clark and Gavin Slate, and it was the lead single off Hicks' second studio album 5:01.

Commercial performance
"Here Comes the Thunder" reached a peak of number ten on the Billboard Canada Country chart for the week of September 13, 2014, marking Hicks' fourth  career top ten hit.  It also reached a peak of number 69 on the Canadian Hot 100 for the week of July 26, 2014. The song has been certified Gold by Music Canada.

Music video
The official music video for "No Truck Song" premiered on May 30, 2014, and was directed by Adam Rothlein. The video includes a race scene and part of a concert, both filmed in Nashville, Tennessee. The police were called during the filming of one scene due to a misunderstanding regarding peel outs, although no one was arrested.

Charts

Certifications

References

2014 songs
2014 singles
Tim Hicks songs
Open Road Recordings singles
Songs written by Tim Hicks
Songs written by Todd Clark
Songs written by Gavin Slate